Omkara is a 2006 Indian crime drama film adapted from Shakespeare's Othello, co-written and directed by Vishal Bhardwaj. It starred an ensemble cast of Ajay Devgn, Kareena Kapoor, Saif Ali Khan, Konkona Sen Sharma, Vivek Oberoi and Bipasha Basu. The director Vishal Bhardwaj himself composed the entire music for the film, including the background score, with lyrics by Gulzar. The film is set in Meerut, a city in Western Uttar Pradesh.

Produced on a budget of 260 million, Omkara was released on 28 July 2006 and grossed 424.12 million worldwide. The film was cited as "10 Must-Watch Indian Titles" by The National. The film garnered awards and nominations in several categories, with particular praise for its direction, music, screenplay, cinematography, and the performances of the ensemble cast, with particular praise for Khan's performance. The film won 41 awards from 106 nominations.

At the 54th National Film Awards, Omkara won awards in three categories, Best Supporting Actress (Konkona Sen Sharma), Best Audiography (Shajith Koyeri, Subhash Sahoo and K. J. Singh) and Special Jury Award (Vishal Bhardwaj). At the 52nd Filmfare Awards, it received nineteen nominations and won nine, including those for Best Actress (Critics), Best Supporting Actress, Best Performance in a Negative Role, Best Production Design, Best Costume Design, Best Sound Design, Best Female Playback Singer and Best Choreography. At the 8th IIFA Awards, it received thirteen nominations and won four, including those for Best Performance in a Negative Role, Best Female Playback Singer, Best Choreography and Special Award for Best Adaptation. Among other wins, the film received two Bollywood Movie Awards, three Global Indian Film Awards, five Screen Awards, five Stardust Awards and five Zee Cine Awards. 

At 30th Cairo International Film Festival, Vishal Bhardwaj received "Best Artistic Contribution in Cinema of a Director" award, at 6th Kara Film Festival, it won awards in three categories, Best Adapted Screenplay, Best Actor and Best Music and at 2nd Asian Festival of First Films, Tassaduq Hussain received Best Cinematography Award.

Awards and nominations

See also 
 List of Bollywood films of 2006

Notes

References

External links 
 Accolades for Omkara at the Internet Movie Database

Lists of accolades by Indian film